Zack Meyer (born August 4, 1992) is a Canadian racing driver from Toronto.

After karting, Meyer moved straight into the Star Mazda Championship for a one-off appearance in 2010. He made two appearances in 2011 for AIM Autosport. He raced a full season for AIM Autosport in 2012 and finished 15th in points with a best finish of ninth (three times). He returned to the series in 2013, which had changed its name to the Pro Mazda Championship. Meyer moved to JDC MotorSports and improved to sixth in the championship with a best finish of fourth in his hometown Toronto race. Meyer will move up the Indy Lights competition in 2014 driving for Team Moore Racing.

Racing record

Star Mazda Championship / Pro Mazda Championship

Indy Lights

 Season still in progress.

References

External links
 
 

1992 births
Living people
Sportspeople from Toronto
Racing drivers from Ontario
Indy Pro 2000 Championship drivers
Indy Lights drivers

Team Moore Racing drivers
JDC Motorsports drivers